Nizar Khalil Muhammad Banat (Abu Kifah; 27 August 1978 – 24 June 2021) was a Palestinian political activist and human rights defender. He was one of the most prominent activists opposing the Palestinian National Authority (PA), criticizing its policies and officials, whom he described as corrupt. Banat was the head of the Freedom and Dignity List. He was beaten to death by a squad belonging to the PA's security forces who arrested him from his home.

In the prisons of the Palestinian Authority
He is best known for his anti-government videos that he posted on social media, addressing corruption and human rights violations. Amira Hass and Jack Khoury (Haaretz) indicate that Banat did not only  criticized Abbas' government, but also Abbas' opponent Mohammed Dahlan, whose supporters are linked in intelligence circles.

The PA arrested him several times on charges of insulting national sentiment, assaulting the PA, and inciting strife against the PA on Facebook.

His house was attacked by security elements after he called on the European Union to cut aid to the PA, due to the postponement of the 2021 Palestinian legislative elections, a process denounced by the European Union on 2 May 2021 on its official account on Twitter. "The Union Commission in Palestine is following with concern the attack [on] the home of activist Nizar Banat was targeted in the town of Dura, in the southern West Bank. Violence against politicians and human rights defenders is unacceptable", the tweet reads.

Death
On 24 June 2021, at about 3:30 a.m. a Palestinian Preventive Security force stormed his house in the Hebron Governorate in the southern West Bank, severely beat him and then arrested him. At 6:45 a.m., the Palestinian Authority officially announced the death of activist Nizar Banat. His family accused the PA of assassinating him with premeditation.

International feedback
European Union: The European Union issued a statement saying, "Shocked and saddened by the death of activist and former legislative candidate Nizar Banat, following his arrest by Palestinian security forces last night. Our condolences to his family and loved ones. A full, independent and transparent investigation must be conducted immediately."
United States: State Department spokesman Ned Price said the United States was "deeply disturbed by the death of Palestinian activist Nizar Banat and the information reported regarding the circumstances of his death." "We have serious concerns about the restrictions imposed by the Palestinian Authority on Palestinians' exercise of freedom of expression and the harassment of activists and civil society organizations", Price added.

References 

1978 births
2021 deaths
Palestinian human rights activists
People from Hebron
People who died in police custody